William Thornhill (c. 1500 – 21 August 1557), of Thornhill in Stalbridge, Dorset, was an English politician.

Family
Thornhill was the eldest son of Thomas Thornhill of Thornhill and his wife Joan née Hussey, daughter of Thomas Hussey of Shapwick. William married twice: firstly to a daughter of William Chauncy of Charlton in Wiltshire, by whom he had two sons and three daughters; secondly to Joan Brydges, daughter of Henry Brydges of Newbury, Berkshire.

Career
He was a Member (MP) of the Parliament of England for Poole in 1529.

References

1557 deaths
English MPs 1529–1536
People from Stalbridge
Year of birth uncertain